Dmitry Kaplunov (born 21 April 1994) is a Belarusian professional footballer who plays for Lokomotiv Gomel.

References

External links 
 
 

1994 births
Living people
People from Baranavichy
Sportspeople from Brest Region
Belarusian footballers
Association football defenders
FC Baranovichi players
FC Luch Minsk (2012) players
FC Dnyapro Mogilev players
FC Granit Mikashevichi players
FC Gomel players
FC Arsenal Dzerzhinsk players
FC Lokomotiv Gomel players